Radipole Lake is a lake on the River Wey, now in the English coastal town of Weymouth, Dorset, once in Radipole, the village and parish of the same name. Along the western shore of the lake, and between Radipole and the town centre of Weymouth, now lies the modern suburb of Southill.

The lake is a nature reserve run by the Royal Society for the Protection of Birds, as it is an important habitat for reedbed birds. The Wild Weymouth Discovery Centre at Radipole Lake features nature and bird exhibits and programs, trails and viewing blinds.

The lake flows into Weymouth Harbour.

External links 

 
 Weymouth and Portland council's pages for Radipole Lake

Royal Society for the Protection of Birds reserves in England
Nature reserves in Dorset
Sites of Special Scientific Interest in Dorset
Geography of Weymouth, Dorset
Tourist attractions in Weymouth, Dorset
Lakes of Dorset
Nature centres in England